Albert Frick may refer to:
 
 Albert Frick (theologian) (1714–1776), German theologian
 Albert Frick (politician) (born 1948), Liechtenstein politician
 Albert Frick (skier) (born 1949), Liechtenstein Olympic alpine skier